"The Larger Bowl" is the fourth track and third single from Rush's 2007 album Snakes & Arrows.

Inspiration and lyrical structure
The lyrics were written by the drummer and primary lyricist Neil Peart. The title was inspired by a "dysentery dream" he had while touring West Africa on his bicycle in 1988.

Peart's book The Masked Rider: Cycling in West Africa includes a chapter entitled "The Larger Bowl" in which he describes the dream. The excerpt in which he mentions the song is as follows:
Anyway... a song was playing in the store, a plaintive ballad called "The Larger Bowl." Something about loneliness and the misfortunes of life, I recall. No such song as far as I know, but I like the title.
In the early 1990s, Peart put words to the title. The song is written in the form of a pantoum.

See also
List of Rush songs

References

Rush (band) songs
2007 singles
Songs written by Geddy Lee
Songs written by Alex Lifeson
Songs written by Neil Peart
Song recordings produced by Nick Raskulinecz
2007 songs
Atlantic Records singles
2006 songs